Nicholas Gordon Pirihi (born 19 April 1977) is a New Zealand police officer and former first-class cricketer.

Pirihi was born at Whangārei in April 1977. He later studied mathematics and science to masters level at the University of Waikato, before gaining a Rhodes Scholarship to read law at Merton College, Oxford. Prior to leaving for England, he was known as a field hockey player and had played for the New Zealand Māori field hockey team. While studying at Oxford, Pirihi played first-class cricket for Oxford University from 1997–99, making eight appearances. He scored 115 runs in his eight matches at an average of 9.58, with a high score of 23. 

After returning to New Zealand, Pihiri worked in the financial markets. Deciding to realise a lifelong dream of becoming a police officer, he joined the New Zealand Police in 2006. He is currently a detective in the Criminal Investigation Branch. Pirihi plays field hockey for the Northland Police, in addition to assisting the Waikato Hockey Association as an administrator.

References

External links

1977 births
Living people
People from Whangārei
New Zealand Māori sportspeople
New Zealand male field hockey players
University of Waikato alumni
New Zealand Rhodes Scholars
Alumni of Merton College, Oxford
New Zealand cricketers
Oxford University cricketers
New Zealand police officers